John Bernard Hayes  (born 15 March 1948) is a New Zealand politician and diplomat. He represented the electorate of Wairarapa for the National Party from 2005 to 2014.

Early life
Hayes received his secondary education at Rongotai College and holds a BAgrSci degree from Lincoln College. He took part in student politics as President of the Lincoln College Students Association and in the New Zealand University Students' Association. He became the inaugural chair of the Chartwell School Board under the "Tomorrow's Schools" reforms of the 1980s.

Career 
After a period working as an economist, Hayes joined the New Zealand Ministry of Foreign Affairs and Trade. He has represented New Zealand in Singapore, India, Bahrain, Saudi Arabia (as chargé d'affaires), in Papua New Guinea (as High Commissioner) and in Iran (as Ambassador, 1993–1995). He served as Principal Private Secretary to Mike Moore during Moore's tenure of the cabinet portfolio of Overseas Trade and Marketing (1984–1990).

As New Zealand's High Commissioner to Papua New Guinea (1989–1993), Hayes took a very active role alongside the former New Zealand Minister of Foreign Affairs and Trade Don McKinnon during the Bougainville conflict in the 1990s. He became involved in negotiations for setting up peace-talks by visiting leaders of the Bougainville Revolutionary Army (BRA), and of its affiliate the Bougainville Interim Government (BIG).  One such meeting saw BRA shooting down Hayes' helicopter. In the 1999 Queen's Birthday Honours, Hayes was appointed an Officer of the New Zealand Order of Merit, for services to the Bougainville peace process.

 he functions as a shareholder and director of business interests in the Wairarapa region. He served as a Director of the New Zealand Export Import Corporation for three years.

In August 2016 he launched his campaign to stand as Mayor of South Wairarapa.

Member of Parliament

In the 2005 election, Hayes contested as a member of the New Zealand National Party, which ranked him 50th on its party list. Simultaneously he stood as a candidate in the Wairarapa electorate, formerly (1999–2005) held by the world's first transsexual mayor (1995–2000), Georgina Beyer, who became a New Zealand Labour Party MP (1999–2007). He won the Wairarapa seat (with a majority of 2752 votes over Denise MacKenzie of the Labour Party) and entered Parliament. He won the Wairarapa seat again in the 2008 general election, becoming a member of John Key's Fifth National Government of New Zealand. Hayes was ranked 52nd on the National Party list for the 2011 election but won the seat and on 20 December was appointed a Parliamentary Private Secretary for Foreign Affairs, reporting to Murray McCully.

Family and community engagement
Hayes serves as a trustee of the "We The Peoples Foundation" and of the "Bridget Nicholls Trust". His interests include yachting and fishing.

Hayes and his wife Helen live in Greytown; their two children work as lawyers.

References

External links
 John Hayes South Wairarapa Mayoralty website

1948 births
Lincoln University (New Zealand) alumni
Living people
New Zealand National Party MPs
New Zealand public servants
Officers of the New Zealand Order of Merit
Ambassadors of New Zealand to Iran
High Commissioners of New Zealand to Papua New Guinea
People educated at Rongotai College
Members of the New Zealand House of Representatives
People from Greytown, New Zealand
New Zealand MPs for North Island electorates
21st-century New Zealand politicians